Dany Roger Bornand da Silva (born 2 March 1993) is a Swiss professional footballer who plays for Lausanne Ouchy as a goalkeeper.

He also holds Portuguese citizenship.

Career
On 29 November 2014, da Silva made his professional debut with FC Sion in a 2014–15 Swiss Super League match against Grasshoppers.

Personal life
Da Silva is of Portuguese descent.

References

External links

1993 births
Sportspeople from Lausanne
Swiss people of Portuguese descent
Living people
Swiss men's footballers
Association football goalkeepers
Yverdon-Sport FC players
FC Le Mont players
FC Sion players
FC Lausanne-Sport players
FC Stade Lausanne Ouchy players
FC Bulle players
Swiss Challenge League players
Swiss 1. Liga (football) players
Swiss Promotion League players
Swiss Super League players